Saint-Arnoult is a commune in the Seine-Maritime department in the Normandy region in northern France.

Geography

Heraldry

Population

Places of interest
 The church of St. Arnoult, dating from the thirteenth century.
 A sixteenth-century stone cross.
 A manorhouse.
Remnants of the château de la Pommeraye.

See also
Communes of the Seine-Maritime department

References

Communes of Seine-Maritime